Kalpana Pandit (born 20 January 1967) is an Indian actress, model, and emergency physician. She owns the film  production company House of Pandit (TM). She is known for her works in Bollywood, and Kannada cinema. In 2008, she hosted the technical awards ceremony of Zee Cine Awards in London. In 2012, Pandit served as one of the jury of the Mrs. America Pageant 2012, which took place on 29 August 2012, at Tucson, Arizona. In November 2013, Pandit served on the Celebrity Judging Panel of "Mrs World 2013" held in Guangzhou, China.

Early life and career
Kalpana Pandit is the granddaughter of Ayurvedic physician Bhishagratna Ayurveda Vidwan Sri B. V. Pandit. After gaining a M.B.B.S. degree from the prestigious Mysore Medical College and Research Institute, she obtained an M.D. in internal medicine, from USA. She then worked as an emergency physician in  USA

She modeled for television commercials; products like Wheel detergent powder, Mysore sandal talc, Nyle, and Ranipal stain remover and Sirtex in India.
In 2000, she made her acting debut with the Bollywood film Gaja Gamini, directed by M. F. Husain.

Filmography

Awards
Best Actress Kannada - South Indian Mega Short Film Festival 2011 Bangalore - Jo Jo  Laali (2010) 
Best Actress- Bangalore Shorts Film Festival 2013 - " Jo Jo Laali"
Actress/ Independent New Producer Award 2013 _ Shiv Rajmudra Chatrapati Shivaji Award Mumbai 2013 for " Janleva 555"
Best Actress-Bollywood International Film Festival 2016 _ Sulige Sikkidaaga " Be fluid as water.... "

References

External links

Official website

Indian film actresses
Actresses in Tamil cinema
Living people
Actresses from Mysore
Actresses in Hindi cinema
Actresses in Kannada cinema
21st-century Indian actresses
1967 births